How Women Love is a 1922 American silent drama film directed by Kenneth S. Webb and starring Betty Blythe, Gladys Hulette and Julia Swayne Gordon.

A promising singer his signed up by a backer for the new opera he is producing, but lays down the condition that she must not fall in love and distract herself. However, she soon develops an attachment for a composer.

Cast
 Betty Blythe as Rosa Roma
 Gladys Hulette as Natalie Nevins
 Julia Swayne Gordon as Mrs. Nevins
 Katherine Stewart as Nana
 Jane Thomas as Peasant Sweetheart
 Anna Ames as Olga
 Robert Frazer as Griffith Ames
 Charles Lane as Ogden Ward
 Henry Sedley as Count Jurka
 Signor N. Salerno as Jacobelli
 Harry Sothern as Dmitri Kavec 
 Templar Saxe as Casanova
 Charles Byer as Peasant Lover
 George Majeroni as The Tenor

References

Bibliography
 Munden, Kenneth White. The American Film Institute Catalog of Motion Pictures Produced in the United States, Part 1. University of California Press, 1997.

External links
 

1922 films
1922 drama films
1920s English-language films
American silent feature films
Silent American drama films
American black-and-white films
Films directed by Kenneth Webb
1920s American films